Ron White (22 May 1920 – 17 March 1992) was an Australian rules footballer who played with Melbourne in the Victorian Football League (VFL).

Notes

External links 

1920 births
Australian rules footballers from Victoria (Australia)
Melbourne Football Club players
1992 deaths